Lyudmil Kirov (born 16 February 1976) is a retired Bulgarian footballer.

Career
Born in Ruse, Kirov began his career in the local Dunav. In June 1998 he went in PFC Velbazhd from town Kyustendil. For one season in Velbazhd Kirov played in only six caps. In next season he went in Cherno More. For the club from Varna he played in 46 caps and scored seven goals. He then played for Beroe Stara Zagora and Dunav Rousse. In July 2008 he signed with Rodopa Smolyan.

References

1976 births
Living people
Bulgarian footballers
PFC Cherno More Varna players
PFC Dobrudzha Dobrich players
PFC Beroe Stara Zagora players
FC Dunav Ruse players
PFC Rodopa Smolyan players
FC Vereya players
First Professional Football League (Bulgaria) players
Association football midfielders
Bulgarian football managers
Sportspeople from Ruse, Bulgaria